Painter of the Wind is a 2008 South Korean historical television series starring Moon Geun-young and Park Shin-yang. Based on the bestselling historical fiction novel by Lee Jung-myung that took artistic license with the premise that perhaps the Joseon painter Shin Yun-bok had really been a woman, it centers on Yun-bok, a talented young painter who disguises herself as a boy to search for her father's murderer. She meets Kim Hong-do, a master painter who guides her into becoming a great artist, and they develop a strong friendship of mentor and disciple.

Produced for SBS by JoongAng Media Network's Drama House, the series aired on SBS TV and its regional affiliates from September 24 to December 4, 2008. It had 20 episodes.

The drama has won numerous awards, including the Asian TV Series Special Award at the 2010 Shanghai Television Festival,  while actress Moon Geun-young received the grand prize at the 2008 SBS Drama Awards, as well as Best TV Actress at the 2009 Baeksang Arts Awards and 2008 Grimae Awards for her role.

Synopsis
In 1766, Kang Su-hang, a painter and senior member of Dohwaseo, the Academy of Painting, was found killed after being secretly commissioned by the son of the crown prince who would later become King Jeongjo (1752-1800, the 22nd King of the Joseon Dynasty). The commission was to paint a portrait of the crown prince. Seo Jing, another member of Dohwaseo, was found dead while investigating the death of Kang Su-hang. In addition, Seo Jing's wife was murdered and his daughter went missing. Ten years later, Kim Hong-do, a senior member of Dohwaseo, discovers Shin Yun-bok, a new student. Hong-do discovers great talent in Yun-bok and tries to protect the student from conspiracies that surround him. King Jeongjo also discovers Yun-bok's enormous talent. Kim Hong-do and Shin Yun-bok serve as the eyes of the king, depicting the true reality of the common people. However, powerful palace officials conspire to get rid of the two painters, and soon afterwards, they are kicked out of Dohwaseo. Then, the king secretly orders the pair to find the portrait of his father painted by Kang Su-hang ten years prior. Kim Hong-do and Shin Yun-bok are successful in recovering the portrait, overcoming hurdles and dangerous traps set up by enemies. The recovery of the painting also helps reveal the secret behind the death of Seo Jing, who is actually Shin Yun-bok's father. In the process, Kim Hong-do realizes that he is truly in love with Shin Yun-bok. However, he tries to leave him because he knows that the affair would be an impossible one. But to everyone's surprise, the truth is revealed. Shin Yun-bok is actually a woman. She had disguised herself as a man to enter Dohwaseo, an institution limited only to males, in order to uncover the truth about her father's death.

Cast

Main Cast
Moon Geun-young as Shin Yun-bok
Kim Yoo-jung as young Yun-bok
Park Shin-yang as Kim Hong-do
Ryu Seung-ryong as Kim Jo-nyun
Bae Soo-bin as King Jeongjo
Moon Chae-won as Jung-hyang, a gisaeng

Supporting Cast

Lee Joon as Shin Young-bok
Lee Byung-joon as young Young-bok
Park Hyuk-kwon as Lee In-moon, Hong-do's friend
Im Ji-eun as Queen Jeongsun
Jung In-gi as Hong Guk-yeong
Kim Eung-soo as Jang Byuk-soo
Ahn Suk-hwan as Shin Han-yeong, Yun-bok's adoptive father
Park Jin-woo as Jang Hyo-won
Han Jung-soo as Seo Jing
Lee Mi-young as Mok Kye-wol
Yoon Joo-sang as Kang Su-hang
Lee Kyung-hwa as Myeong, Seo Jing's wife
Han Yeo-woon as Jung-sook, In-moon's sister
Yoon Bong-gil
 Ko Kyu-pil as hwawon
Lee Sang-hee as hwawon
Son Hwa-ryeong as gisaeng
Min Joon-hyun as eunuch
Ha Dae-ro as cadet
Kim Won-seok
Jang Moon-seok as Dol-soi
Choi Gwi-hwa
Jo Dong-hee
Kim Bo-mi as Mak-nyun, Jung-hyang's maid
Jeon Jin-gi
Im Ho as Lee Myung-ki
Yoo Yun-ji
Jeong Yu-mi
Choi Soo-han
Tae Hwang

Original soundtrack

Ratings

Source: TNS Media Korea

Awards and nominations

Continuity errors
 In E09 Sang-gung uses the pen name Hyewon... before this pen name has been given (E13).
 In E15 56:28, the bad guy is plainly played by the same actor as the mysterious man (Baek Dong-soo).
 Problems in sexagesimal cycle. When "now" is 1777 = jeong-yu 정유, then "ten years before" is 1766 = byeong-sul 병술. And not byeong-jin 병진. Both the Korean soundtrack ("everywhere") and the Chinese characters in the "secret library" (E14, 09:27) are describing 丙辰年, i.e. 1796.

Artistic license
The events described by the twenty episodes are dated 1777 (=now) with flashbacks from 1766 (=ten years before). This crosscutting style between two time periods required some artistic license, with the meager historical facts known about the painters involved. Among the distortions are:

 Painter Yi Myeong-gi was only known by 1791–1796. Painting of Seo Jik-su (E08) was drawn in 1796.
 Portrait of Chae Jegong (E09) was drawn in 1792 by Yi Myeong-gi, not in 1777 by Kim Hong-do.
 Gang Se-hwang lived from 1713 to 1791, and therefore was not murdered in 1766.
 Portrait of King Taejo, Taejo Eojin, was painted in 1872.
 Dasan Jeong Yak-yong lived 1762–1836. In 1766, he hadn't drawn any machine sketches.
 Nam Gye-u lived 1811–88. His Butterflies were not painted circa 1777.

Such artistic license allowed for the screenplay to have narrative cohesion, and has been largely acknowledged by the writer. Each episode of the series begins with a foreword, stating: "The contents of this drama may not match some of the historical facts" (on the left of the text is the stylized title).

Several academics have criticized the drama due to these historical distortions. Despite that, it resulted in an increased interest for artistic topics among the general public. An exhibit at Gansong Art Museum in Seongbuk-dong attracted 200,000 visitors when it opened on October 12, 2008, who bought more than 2,000 prints of the art on display.

Featured paintings
More than forty paintings were featured in the series, providing a possible context for each of them. For the paintings from the Hyewon pungsokdo, this exercise was all the more striking since the present-day titles were not given by the painter himself, but were attributed more than a century later.

외유사생 (A journey to paint from life) E01

장파형 (Before tempest) E02

장파형수 (Hand crushing punishment) E03

군선도 (Painting of the nineteen immortals) E04

단오풍정 (Scenery on Dano day) E05

동제각화 (One topic, two paintings) E06

정풍 (Gathering evidences) E07

어진화사 1 (Imperial Master Painter) E08

어진화사 2 (Imperial Master Painter) E09

어진화사 3 (Imperial Master Painter) E10

어진화사 4 (Imperial Master Painter) E11

봉심 (Bongsim Evaluation) E12

생과 사 (Life and Death) E13

잃어버린 예진 (Searching for the Lost Yejin) E14

다섯개의 초상 (Portraits of the Five Bamboos) E15

얼굴없는 초상 (The Faceless Portrait) E16

십년전 여인 (The Girl from Ten Years Before) E17

원수 (Enemies) E18

쟁투 (Fight) E19

미인도 (Portrait of a Beauty) E20

References

External links

 Painter of the Wind official SBS website 
 
 

Television series set in the Joseon dynasty
2008 South Korean television series debuts
2008 South Korean television series endings
Seoul Broadcasting System television dramas
Korean-language television shows
South Korean historical television series
Television shows based on South Korean novels
Television series by Drama House